Sami Laakkonen (born 24 February 1974) is a Finnish former bandy player who played as a forward. Laakkonen was brought up by WP 35 but moved abroad to enhance his career. He played for the Finnish national bandy team, scoring the decisive goal in the final of the 2004 World Championship. At the 2016 World Championship, he made his last appearance as a national team player. After the 2018–19 season he also retired at club level.

Laakkonen's list of clubs is as follows:
WP 35 (1993-1997)
Vetlanda BK (1997-2002)
IFK Vänersborg (2002-2004)
Vodnik (2004-2005)
Zorkij (2005-2009)
Dynamo Kazan (2009-2014)
Akilles (2014-2019)

References

External links
 
 

1974 births
Living people
Finnish bandy players
Expatriate bandy players in Sweden
Expatriate bandy players in Russia
Warkauden Pallo -35 players
Vetlanda BK players
IFK Vänersborg players
Vodnik Arkhangelsk players
Zorky Krasnogorsk players
Dynamo Kazan players
Borgå Akilles players
Bandy World Championship-winning players